The 2017 Asian Weightlifting Championships were held in Ashgabat, Turkmenistan between April 23 and April 29, 2017. It was the 47th men's and 28th women's championship.

Medal summary

Men

Women

Medal table 

Ranking by Big (Total result) medals 

Ranking by all medals: Big (Total result) and Small (Snatch and Clean & Jerk)

Team ranking

Men

Women

Participating nations 
144 athletes from 27 nations competed.

 (2)
 (2)
 (16)
 (9)
 (8)
 (1)
 (10)
 (4)
 (9)
 (6)*
 (2)
 (1)
 (2)
 (1)
 (5)
 (1)
 (3)
 (3)
 (9)
 (1)
 (3)
 (2)
 (7)
 (15)
 (5)
 (10)
 (7)

 Athletes from Kuwait competed as Asian Weightlifting Federation (AWF) due to the suspension of the country's Weightlifting Federation.

References

Results

External links
 

Asian Weightlifting Championships
Asian Weightlifting Championships
Asian Weightlifting Championships
International sports competitions hosted by Turkmenistan
Sport in Ashgabat
April 2017 sports events in Asia
Weightlifting in Turkmenistan
21st century in Ashgabat